The Columbus Buckeyes were a professional baseball team in the American Association from 1883 to 1884. In two seasons they won 101 games and lost 104 for a winning percentage of .493. Their home games were played at Recreation Park in Columbus, Ohio.

The Buckeyes were managed by Horace Phillips in 1883 (32-65) and Gus Schmelz in 1884 (69-39). Some of their top players were pitchers Ed "Cannonball" Morris, Frank Mountain, and Ed Dundon, the first deaf player in the major leagues, and outfielder Tom Brown.

In 1884, the Buckeyes threw two no-hitters in the span of a week. Morris pitched his on May 29 and Mountain threw one on June 5.

See also
1883 Columbus Buckeyes season
1884 Columbus Buckeyes season
Columbus Buckeyes all-time roster

External links
Baseball Reference team index

American Association (1882–1891) baseball teams
Defunct baseball teams in Ohio
Baseball teams in Columbus, Ohio
Baseball teams disestablished in 1884
Baseball teams established in 1883
1883 establishments in Ohio
1884 disestablishments in Ohio